Forest Pathology/Journal de Pathologie Forestière/Zeitschrift für Forstpathologie is a bimonthly peer-reviewed scientific journal dedicated to forest pathology. It covers the subject of tree diseases caused by phytoplasmas, viruses, bacteria, fungi, and nematodes as well as those caused by genetic, physical, chemical, and environmental factors such as air pollution.

According to the Journal Citation Reports, the journal has a 2017 impact factor of 1.741.

References

External links

English-language journals
Wiley-Blackwell academic journals
Bimonthly journals
Forestry journals
Publications established in 1971